Sejm ekstraordynaryjny, sejm nadzwyczajny (special sejm) was a kind of sejm in pre-partition Polish–Lithuanian Commonwealth. It could be convene by the King in special occasions (e.g. war) for two or three weeks.

In 1637 sejm walny prohibited convening sejm ekstraordynaryjny.

References

Bibliography

Sejm of the Polish–Lithuanian Commonwealth